Trent Noel (born 14 January 1976) is a Trinidadian football midfielder. He currently plays for Joe Public of the TT Pro League. He has also represented Trinidad and Tobago on national team.

References

External links 

Trinidad and Tobago footballers
Joe Public F.C. players
TT Pro League players
1976 births
Living people
2007 CONCACAF Gold Cup players

Association football midfielders
Trinidad and Tobago international footballers